Cosoryx is an extinct genus of antilocaprid that lived in the Miocene of Nevada. Fossils of this genus have also been found in the Santa Fe Group in New Mexico.

Cosoryx has sometimes been considered synonymous with Merycodus.

References

Prehistoric pronghorns
Miocene even-toed ungulates
Miocene mammals of North America
Prehistoric even-toed ungulate genera
Fossil taxa described in 1869